Cona Creek is a locality in the Central Highlands Region, Queensland, Australia.

Geography 
The creek of the same name rises in Carnarvon Park and then flows through neighbouring Wealwandangie entering the locality of Cona Creek from the south-east and then flows through the locality to exit in the north-west (Lochington/Minerva).

The Dawson Developmental Road passes through the locality from north (Minerva) to west (Nandowrie).

History 
The locality presumably takes its name from the creek, which in turn is an Aboriginal word meaning mud.

Education 
There are no schools in Cona Creek, but neighboroughing Springsure has primary schooling and secondary schooling to Year 10. For secondary schooling to Year 12, the closest school is in Emerald.

References 

Central Highlands Region
Localities in Queensland